Dragoș Petre Dumitriu (17 February 1964 – 13 November 2021) was a Romanian politician and journalist.

Biography
He was a member of the Greater Romania Party and served in the Chamber of Deputies from 2004 to 2008.

Dumitriu contracted COVID-19 in October 2021, amid its pandemic in Romania. He died from a post-COVID heart attack on 13 November 2021, at the age of 57.

References

1964 births
2021 deaths
Greater Romania Party politicians
Members of the Chamber of Deputies (Romania)
Deaths from the COVID-19 pandemic in Romania